State Route 188 (SR 188) is a  state highway that runs west-to-east through portions of Grady and Thomas counties in the southwestern part of the U.S. state of Georgia.

Route description

SR 188 begins at an intersection with SR 93 in Cairo, in Grady County. It heads north through town to an intersection with SR 38 Spur (1st Avenue NE). It continues north to meet US 84/SR 38, before leaving Cairo. It stair-steps its way to the northeast to meet SR 3 Alternate (Main Street) in Ochlocknee. It crosses into Thomas County on its way. On the eastern edge of town is an intersection with US 19/SR 3/SR 300. Farther to the east is a concurrency with SR 202. In Coolidge, the highway intersects US 319/SR 35 (Pine Street). SR 188 continues to the southeast and curves to the east to meet its eastern terminus, an intersection with SR 33 northwest to Pavo.

SR 188 is not part of the National Highway System, a system of roadways important to the nation's economy, defense, and mobility.

Major intersections

See also

References

External links

 
 Georgia Roads (Routes 181 - 200)

188
Transportation in Grady County, Georgia
Transportation in Thomas County, Georgia